The law of chastity is a moral code defined by the Church of Jesus Christ of Latter-day Saints (LDS Church). According to the church, chastity means that "sexual relations are proper only between a man and a woman who are legally and lawfully wedded as husband and wife." Therefore, abstinence from sexual relations outside of marriage, and complete fidelity to one's spouse during marriage, are required. As part of the law of chastity, the church teaches its members to abstain from adultery and fornication.

General standards

Within the LDS Church, chastity means more than abstinence from sex. It means to be morally clean in "thoughts, words, and actions." It also means sexual relations are only permitted between a husband and wife. The church teaches its members that "no one, male or female, is to have sexual relations before marriage. After marriage, sexual relations are permitted only with our spouse."

Members of the LDS Church believe that sexuality between man and woman lawfully married is divinely appointed and has two purposes: to "multiply, and replenish the Earth" as commanded by God to Adam and Eve, and to strengthen the bond between man and woman so that they might "become one flesh". A church handbook states that "[p]hysical intimacy between husband and wife is intended to be beautiful and sacred. It is ordained of God for the creation of children and for the expression of love between husband and wife. Tenderness and respect—not selfishness—should guide their intimate relationship."

The church has made its views clear in many publications and in recent news releases that "marriage between a man and a woman is ordained of God". While opposing homosexual behavior, the church advises its leaders and members to reach out with understanding and respect to individuals who are attracted to those of the same gender.

Sexual relations are deemed proper only between a man and a woman who are legally and lawfully wedded as husband and wife. Any other sexual relations, including those between persons of the same gender, are considered sinful and undermining of the divinely created institution of the family. The church accordingly affirms defining marriage as the legal and lawful union between a man and a woman.

Youth teaching

An LDS Church publication published particularly for young men and women states: "Before marriage, do not participate in passionate kissing, lie on top of another person, or touch the private, sacred parts of another person's body, with or without clothing. Do not do anything else that arouses sexual feelings. Do not arouse those emotions in your own body.”  Youth are taught in church classes that sexual relations are sacred, and they should avoid "fondling of bodies, one's own or that of others". Masturbation is "not condoned but is not considered homosexual".

Importance
The LDS Church places great emphasis on the law of chastity. Commitment to live the law of chastity is required for baptism, and adherence is required to receive a temple recommend. The Book of Mormon teaches that sexual sins are "most abominable above all sins save it be the shedding of innocent blood or denying the Holy Ghost". Church leaders have similarly emphasized its importance. When discussing premarital sex in his book The Miracle of Forgiveness the apostle (and later church president) Spencer W. Kimball quoted church president David O. McKay in stating, "Your virtue is worth more than your life. Please, young folk, preserve your virtue even if you lose your lives." In the book Mormon Doctrine the apostle Bruce R. McConkie wrote in the section "Chastity" that it is better to be "dead clean, than alive unclean" and that many Mormon parents would rather their child "come back in a pine box with [their] virtue than return alive without it". It was a highly influential all-time bestseller in the LDS community and was viewed by many members both then and now as representing official doctrine despite never being endorsed by the church.

Ezra Taft Benson, one of the church's presidents, wrote:

Violation of the law of chastity may result in a church membership council, including formal membership restrictions or withdrawal of membership.

In endowment ceremony
The law of chastity is one of the covenants members of the LDS Church promise by oath to keep during the endowment ceremony of the temple.

Soaking

In 2021 reports of LDS church members "soaking" (where a penis penetrates a vagina but then remains still, thus not considered sex) as a workaround to the church's Law of Chastity made international news and received millions of views and social media tags. Many described the rumors as a myth while others stated that they knew people who had participated in the action. Other articles described a related act among LDS members of "jump humping" where two people soak while another jumps on the bed beside them. Soaking between two LDS characters was discussed on the 2013 Amazon comedy series Alpha House.

Includes broader transgressions
Activities considered a violation of the law of chastity include both adultery and fornication as well as broader behavior. While serving as church president, Kimball taught that the law of chastity encompasses "all sexual relations outside marriage—petting, sex perversion, masturbation, and preoccupation with sex in one's thoughts and talking. Included are every hidden and secret sin and all unholy and impure thoughts and practices."

Victims of rape, incest, or sexual abuse are not guilty of sin and are not considered to have broken the law of chastity. However, they often feel that they have lost their virtue, which intensifies the feelings of shame and guilt experienced by many victims of rape. In the Book of Mormon, it states, "For behold, many of the daughters of the Lamanites have they taken prisoners; and [they] depriv[ed] them of that which was most dear and precious above all things, which is chastity and virtue". In a general conference address, Richard G. Scott explained, "The victim must do all in his or her power to stop the abuse. Most often, the victim is innocent because of being disabled by fear or the power or authority of the offender. At some point in time, however, the Lord may prompt a victim to recognize a degree of responsibility for abuse. Your priesthood leader will help assess your responsibility so that, if needed, it can be addressed."

In addition, members are taught to dress modestly, to control their thoughts, and to avoid pornography. Dressing immodestly is not a violation of the law of chastity, but "modesty promotes chastity". Members who are married are instructed to "be faithful to your spouse in thought, word, and action.  Stay away from situations where temptation may develop."

According to the church, even though the violation of the law of chastity is considered a serious sin, one who has violated the law of chastity can repent and receive forgiveness from God.

Homosexuality

The LDS Church teaches that same-sex sexual and romantic feelings are not a choice or sin and that members should be supported in identifying with terms like gay, lesbian, or bisexual. Members whose sexual orientation is not strictly heterosexual can participate in temple ordinances and remain in good standing, although, for this they are not allowed to express their sexuality through dating people of the same sex. These teachings leave strictly-homosexually-oriented members with the option of entering a mixed-orientation opposite-sex marriage, or living a celibate lifestyle without any sexual expression (including masturbation).

Masturbation

On many occasions church leaders have taught that members should not masturbate as part of obedience to the law of chastity. Salient examples of this include a church guide to stop masturbating produced in the 1970s. Another is the 1990 edition of the church's youth guidelines pamphlet which stated that the "Lord specifically forbids ... masturbation" with the next two editions (including the most current one) alluding to it with statements forbidding anything that "arouses" any sexual feelings or emotions in one's "own body". Apostle Spencer W. Kimball, who later served as church president, warned of the "possible damages" and "dangers" of this "common indescretion" on various occasions calling it a "reprehensible sin" that grows "with every exercise".

The apostle Boyd K. Packer gave a 1976 general conference address "To Young Men Only" warning young men not to tamper with their little factory (a euphemism for their reproductive system) lest it speed up and become a guilt-and depression-inducing habit that is not easy to resist. He gave vigorous exercise as a method to help control thoughts and break the habit of masturbation since it is a "transgression" that is "not pleasing to the Lord". The talk was printed as a pamphlet and widely distributed by the church from 1980 to 2016. Since 1985 the church has provided a manual for parents to use in discussing sexuality with their children. The manual includes statements that "prophets have condemned [masturbation] as a sin" and "perversion of the body's passions" that causes one to "become carnal". The most recent explicit mention of masturbation by top leaders in public discourse was by Tad R. Callister who stated in a 2013 speech at BYU-Idaho that God "condemns self-abuse" (a euphemism for masturbation).

Pornography
As part of teaching the law of chastity, LDS Church leaders have repeatedly condemned the use of sexually arousing literature and visual material for decades.

See also

 Beliefs and practices of The Church of Jesus Christ of Latter-day Saints
 Modesty: Church of Jesus Christ of Latter-day Saints
 Sexuality and Mormonism
 Thou shalt not commit adultery

References

Sexuality and Mormonism
Latter Day Saint temple practices
Latter Day Saint terms
Religious law
Sexual abstinence and religion